Usama Riaz (1993  – 23 March 2020) was a Pakistani physician from Gilgit-Baltistan.

Career 
During his career, Riaz screened pilgrims who had returned to Pakistan from Iran.

He also treated people in intensive care diagnosed with COVID-19, despite lacking personal protective equipment, which increased his personal risk.

Death 
Riaz died on 23 March 2020, from COVID-19 complications at the age of 26. Riaz was the first Pakistani doctor to die from the virus.

On 27 March 2020, he was posthumously awarded the Nishan-e-Kashmir, the highest award of the state, by Prime Minister of Azad Kashmir for his services. Hafiz Hafeezur Rehman, Chief Minister of Gilgit-Baltistan called his death a "national tragedy".

See also 
 COVID-19 pandemic in Pakistan
 List of deaths due to COVID-19 pandemic

References

1990s births
Year of birth uncertain
2020 deaths
Pakistani intensivists
People from Gilgit
Deaths from the COVID-19 pandemic in Pakistan